Bridei V (Gaelic: Bruide mac Fergusa)  was king of Fortriu from 761 until 763. He was the brother of Óengus.  His death is recorded by the Annals of Ulster and the Annals of Tigernach.

See also
House of Óengus

References 

763 deaths
Pictish monarchs
8th-century Scottish monarchs
Year of birth unknown